Homer Franklin Spragins (November 9, 1920 – December 10, 2002) was an American professional baseball pitcher.

References

External links
Baseball Reference.com page

1920 births
2002 deaths
People from Grenada, Mississippi
Philadelphia Phillies players
Baseball players from Mississippi
Mississippi State Bulldogs baseball players
Major League Baseball pitchers
Memphis Chickasaws players
Utica Blue Sox players
Gadsden Pilots players
Birmingham Barons players
Macon Peaches players
People from Minter City, Mississippi